is a stony asteroid, classified as near-Earth object and potentially hazardous asteroid of the Apollo group, that measures approximately 2 kilometers in diameter. It was discovered on 27 August 2002, by the LINEAR project at Lincoln Laboratory's Experimental Test Site in Socorro, New Mexico, United States.

Orbit and classification 

 is a S-type asteroid that orbits the Sun at a distance of 0.7–1.4 AU once every 1 years and 1 month (397 days). Its orbit has an eccentricity of 0.34 and an inclination of 25° with respect to the ecliptic. Taken at Palomar Observatory in 1955, a first precovery from the during the Digitized Sky Survey extends the body's observation arc by 47 years prior to its official discovery observation at Socorro.

It has an Earth minimum orbital intersection distance , which translates into 2.6 LD.

Physical characteristics 

Lightcurve analysis gave a rotation period of 47 hours with a brightness variation of 0.35 magnitude, superseding a lightcurve previously obtained by Czech astronomer Petr Pravec at Ondřejov Observatory in 2003, which gave a shorter period of 29 hours and an amplitude of 0.3 magnitude.

According to the survey carried out by the Japanese Akari satellite, the asteroid measures 1.12 kilometers in diameter and its surface has an albedo of 0.428, while the Collaborative Asteroid Lightcurve Link assumes an albedo of 0.040 and calculates a diameter of 3.49 kilometers with an absolute magnitude of 16.4.

Numbering and naming 

This minor planet was numbered by the Minor Planet Center on 10 September 2003. As of 2018, it has not been named.

Notes

References

External links 
 Lightcurve plot of (68950) 2002 QF15, Palmer Divide Observatory, B. D. Warner (2006)
 Dictionary of Minor Planet Names, Google books
 
 
 

068950
068950
068950
20020827